The Basilica of Our Lady of the Holy Rosary in Karumathampatti, Tamil Nadu is a Catholic Shrine. The feast of Our Lady of Holy Rosary is celebrated on the first Sunday of October every year.

Karumathampatty was already a pilgrimage centre in 1640. St. John de Britto visited the church at least 3 times. The original chapel was destroyed in 1684 by the soldiers of the Mysore Rajah Saraboji but rebuilt soon after. The church was again destroyed by Tipu Sultan in 1784 and rebuilt in 1803. It is visited by huge numbers of people in order to venerate Our Lady of the Rosary and to pray for favours. It was announced on 22 July 2019 that the church had been granted the status of a minor basilica and the formal elevation was held on 6 October 2019, the feast day.

References

Basilica churches in Tamil Nadu
Shrines to the Virgin Mary
Roman Catholic shrines in India